Sattel Pass (el. 932 m.) is a mountain pass in the canton of Schwyz in Switzerland.

It connects Pfäffikon and Seewen.

The pass was in use as early as the 13th century as an access route to the St. Gotthard Pass. The road was built in 1860, and along with the railway line to Arth it has become one of the most important east–west arteries in central Switzerland.

See also
 List of highest paved roads in Europe
 List of mountain passes

Mountain passes of Switzerland
Mountain passes of the Alps
Mountain passes of the canton of Schwyz
Rail mountain passes of Switzerland